The Goodhue Building is an office building in the downtown area of Beaumont, Texas. Built in 1926 by Forrest Goodhue, the building has 190 offices and is one of the most decorative structures in the area. The building has 11 stories and a penthouse. The building was built in a Tudor gothic style by Tisdale, Stone & Pinson, with an asymmetric penthouse.

Photo gallery

See also

National Register of Historic Places listings in Jefferson County, Texas

References

External links

Office buildings completed in 1926
Buildings and structures in Beaumont, Texas
Office buildings on the National Register of Historic Places in Texas
Historic district contributing properties in Texas
National Register of Historic Places in Jefferson County, Texas